William A. Grundy was a footballer in the early 20th century.

Playing career
Grundy started his career with Blackpool in 1906. Two years later and he had scored 26 goals in 63 games for the club, including being top scorer in the League, with eight goals, in 1906–07.

After spells with  Bolton Wanderers and Northern Nomads he joined Huddersfield Town in 1909, where he stayed for two years. On 23 April 1910 he guested for Port Vale in their vital Potteries derby encounter with Stoke City Reserves. Grundy scored twice but the match was abandoned due to a pitch invasion. He agreed to assist the club 'in times of need', these times never came however and returned to Huddersfield. After leaving the Terriers, he had a short spell back at Blackpool before he finished his career with a second spell at Northern Nomads.

References
Specific

General

Year of birth missing
Year of death missing
English footballers
Association football midfielders
English Football League players
Bolton Wanderers F.C. players
Blackpool F.C. players
Huddersfield Town A.F.C. players
Northern Nomads F.C. players
Place of birth missing